The Cleveland Division of Fire provides fire protection and works with Cleveland EMS to provide
emergency medical service to the city of Cleveland, Ohio.

Stations and apparatus

The Division of Fire operates out of a headquarters building at 1645 Superior Avenue, which was completed in 1974 at a cost of about $1.6 million.

 below is a complete list of all stations and apparatus operated by the Cleveland Fire Department.

Disbanded companies
Since 2000, these companies have been closed:
 Engine 2 stationed at Fire Station 21 closed in 2011 and re-opened in 2017 at Station 28.
 Engine 17 closed in 2011.
 Ladder 9 closed in 2011.
 Ladder 17 closed in 2004.
 Ladder 42 closed in 2011.
 Battalion 1 stationed at Fire Station 17 closed in 2011.
 Rescue Squads 3 and 4 closed in 2013.
 Engine 21 (fire boat) is only staffed when needed by Engine 2 members.

References

External links

Fire departments in Ohio
Organizations based in Cleveland
Government of Cleveland
1863 establishments in Ohio